The Short Annals of Leinster, aka Annala Gearr Laigin, is an Irish annal, covering the years 593 to 1607. It was created by a number of unknown scribes, thought to be monks or chroniclers, or both, between c. 1525 to 1625.

See also

 Annla Gearra as Proibhinse Ard Macha
 Short Annals of Tirconaill

References

 Dublin, Trinity College MS H. 4. 31, ff. 98, 103. For further details see T. K. Abbott and E. J. Gwynn (eds.), Catalogue of the Irish manuscripts in the library of Trinity College, Dublin (Dublin, 1921), entry 1372, p. 223.
 Dublin, Trinity College MS H. 4. 25, ff. 190-1. For further details see Catalogue of the Irish manuscripts in the library of Trinity College, Dublin, entry 1366, p. 220.
 Pól Breathnach, Short Annals of Leinster, in Irish Book Lover 24 (Dublin 1936) pp. 58–60.
 Eugene O'Curry, Lectures on the manuscript materials of ancient Irish history (Dublin 1861; repr. Dublin, 1878 and 1995).
 Paul Walsh, The dating of Irish annals, in Irish Historical Studies 2 (1941), pp. 355–75.
 Gearóid Mac Niocaill, The medieval Irish annals (Dublin: DIAS, 1975).
 Daniel P. Mc Carthy, The Irish Annals: their genesis, evolution and history (Dublin 2008).

External links
 http://www.ucc.ie/celt/published/G100021/index.html

Irish-language literature
Medieval literature
16th-century manuscripts
17th-century manuscripts
Early Irish literature
Irish texts
1500s books
Irish chronicles
Irish manuscripts